This is a list of venues used for professional baseball in Boston, Massachusetts. The information is a compilation of the information contained in the references listed.

South End Grounds
Home of: 
Boston Red Stockings/Beaneaters/Braves  – National Association (1871–1875) / National League (1876–1914 part)
Boston Blues – New England League (1886–1887, 1893)
Location: Walpole Street (southwest, home plate); railroad tracks (northwest, left field); Columbus Avenue (southeast, right field)
Currently: Parking lot between Northeastern University's Columbus Parking Garage and Ruggles Station of the Orange Line of the MBTA

Dartmouth Street Grounds a.k.a. Union Athletic Grounds or Union Grounds
Home of: Boston Reds/Unions – Union Association (1884)
Also used as a neutral site for one game in the 1887 World Series
Location: Huntington Avenue (to the north - home plate); Boston and Albany Railroad tracks (northeast - home plate and third base); Dartmouth Street (southeast - left and center fields); Boston and Providence Railroad tracks (south - center and right fields); Irvington Street (west, right field and third base - approximately corresponds to Yarmouth Street)
Currently: Copley Place

Congress Street Grounds
Home of:
Boston Reds – Players' League (1890) / American Association (1891)
Boston Beaneaters – NL (1894 part)
Location: Congress Street (south); Farnsworth Street (west)
Currently: Industrial, warehouses

Huntington Avenue Grounds
Home of: Boston Red Sox – American League (1901–1911)
Location: Huntington Avenue (northwest, left field); Rogers (now Forsyth) Street (southwest, third base); railroad tracks (southeast, first base); across the tracks to the north from South End Grounds
Currently: Solomon Court at Cabot Center on the campus of Northeastern University

Braves Field
Home of: Boston Braves – NL (mid-1915–1952)
Location: Commonwealth Avenue (south, first base); Gaffney Street (east, right field); railroad tracks (north, left field); Babcock Street (west, third base)
Currently: Nickerson Field

Fenway Park
Home of:
Boston Red Sox – American League (1912–present)
Boston Braves – NL (1914 part – 1915 part)
Location: 4 Yawkey Way (24 Jersey Street) (southwest, third base); Brookline Avenue (northwest, left field corner); Lansdowne Street (north, left field); Ipswich Street (east, right field); Van Ness Street (southeast, first base)

See also
Lists of baseball parks

Sources
Peter Filichia, Professional Baseball Franchises, Facts on File, 1993.
Phil Lowry, Green Cathedrals,  several editions.
Michael Benson, Ballparks of North America, McFarland, 1989.
Lawrence Ritter, Lost Ballparks, Penguin, 1992.
Marc Okkonen, ''Baseball Memories 1900–1909, Sterling, 1992.

External links
Boston Public Library - Sports Temples of Boston

 
Baseball parks
Boston
baseball parks